Sunyani is a city and the capital town of the Bono Region and the Sunyani Municipal of Ghana. Sunyani had a population of 74,240  at the 2010 population and housing census. The city consists mainly of the Bonos by tribe.

History
Sunyani is surrounded by the forested uplands in the mid-south western part of Ghana. The city of Sunyani rose as an outpost camp for elephant hunters during the 19th century; its name derives from the Akan word for elephant, 'Osono'. In 1924, the colonial government designated Sunyani as a district headquarters. Following the construction of a road connecting Sunyani and the city of Kumasi, Sunyani became an important hub for the distribution of cocoa, kola nuts, and staple foods such as maize and yams. Today Sunyani is home to the Brong-Ahafo regional government and high court. Although considerably smaller than Kumasi, Sunyani is growing rapidly and has effectively engulfed the suburbs of Fiapre and Abesim, amongst others. Sunyani is a clean and well maintained city with a thriving economy.

Economy
The economy of Sunyani is predominantly agrarian with approximately 48% of the population engaged in agriculture production. About 24 percent of the population is employed in the service sector, followed by commerce and industry which employ 15% and 13% of the populace, respectively.
Many women and unskilled people are engaged in commerce notably in the  Wednesday Market]]. The city's growth is boosted by Sunyani's high-quality water supply. Sunyani is provided with electricity by the Volta River Authority (VRA). Water sources include rain water and water from streams, rivers and springs. However, in severe harmattan (dry) conditions, water can become more difficult to access.

Industries
Sunyani is currently the home of African Global Pharma Limited (AGP), the only pharmaceutical manufacturing company in Sunyani and the Northern Sector of Ghana. The company is an affiliated company of AGP Canada Inc with corporate office in Toronto, Ontario, Canada and produces generic drugs. The multi-national mining company – Newmont's Gold presence in nearby Kenyase has boosted the city's economy and growth by all dimensions.

Banking
The city has a number of financial institutions including a branch of the Bank of Ghana, Ghana Commercial Bank, Barclays Bank, SG-SSB Bank, OmniBank, Zenith Bank, Agricultural Development Bank of Ghana, Stanbic Bank, Ecobank Ghana and the National Investment Bank. There are also six rural banks, a number of credit unions and insurance institutions complementing the financial service provision of the city.

Communications
The city of Sunyani is outfitted with modern communication facilities which include fixed telephone and fax lines, pay phones, mobile phones, internet and e-mail services. Additionally; postal services are available in the form of post office, as well as expedited mail services provided by EMS (Express mail service), DHL and FedEx.

Tourism
Tourism in Sunyani is based on the natural environment surrounding the city. There are a number of three 3-star hotels, over fifteen modern hotels and rated hostels, and a number of guest houses and restaurants that are also found in the city.	Among the city's attractions is the Cocoa House, a high rise that dominates the Sunyani skyline. The building houses the headquarters of several Bono regional companies, and numerous boutiques. Other buildings of interest in Sunyani include Christ the King Cathedral, and Queen of Peace Building, Knight of St. John House. In addition, the Kintampo waterfalls and the Boabeng monkey sanctuary in Fiema, are a short distance outside the city.

Climate

Health
The city of Sunyani has three hospitals, one of which is Sunyani Regional Hospital, which is a state-of-the-art development, opened in 2003. Eight clinics and three maternity homes also operate in Sunyani. There are a lot of clinics also to be found.

Transportation
Sunyani is served by the Sunyani Airport which is a domestic airport opened on 13 July 1974. However, due to runway length limitations the airport is unsuitable for use by medium range aircraft, and generally only connects passengers to the Kumasi Airport, and Takoradi Airports. Public transportation include road transport provided by MetroMass, VIP and Taxicab or Tro tro.

There are Public Transports from Sunyani to major cities such as Accra; Kumasi, Mim, Ahafo ; Cape Coast, Takoradi; Tamale; Tema; Ho; Wa; Bolgatanga; Elubo; Aflao, Techiman.

Education
Sunyani is home to several higher education institutions in the country, including the Sunyani Technical University the then, Sunyani Polytechnic, the University of Energy and Natural Resources at Fiapre near Sunyani formally the Kwame Nkrumah University of Science and Technology - Agric School, Catholic University College of Ghana at Fiapre and the College of Science, Arts and Education at Penkwase - Law School. Other institutions with satellite centres in the city include University of Cape Coast, and the Kwame Nkrumah University of Science and Technology – KNUST that holds part-time and long distance programs in Sunyani.

Sunyani has numerous Senior High Schools with St. James Seminary, which has been rated among the best five Senior High Schools in Ghana. Others include Sunyani Business Senior High School, Sunyani Secondary School, and, attracting students from throughout the Brong-Ahafo region and beyond, the highly ranked Senior High School (Susec - best academic performing school in WASSCE since 2011).

Several primary, other secondary and technical schools can be found within Sunyani and its suburbs, including: St. Mary's; Lawrence Demonstration; Wesley's; Divine Montessori; Ridge Primary; Twene Amanfo Secondary Technical School (TASTECH); Sunyani Business Senior High School; Notre Dame High School (Ghana) and Don Bosco Vocational Technical Institute.

Awards
Sunyani was voted the cleanest city and settlement in Ghana for the year 2007.

Sister city
Sunyani, in partnership with nearby Techiman, currently has a sister city relationship with:

References

External links

 Sunyani cleanest city in Ghana
 Sunyani population data
 Encyclopædia Britannica blub	
 Sunyani Profile
 District: Sunyani Municipal from statoids.com
 Notre Dame Senior Secondary School

 		 	

 
Regional capitals in Ghana
Populated places in the Bono Region